In graph theory, the Hadwiger conjecture states that if  is loopless and has no  minor then its chromatic number satisfies  It is known to be true for  The conjecture is a generalization of the four-color theorem and is considered to be one of the most important and challenging open problems in the field.

In more detail, if all proper colorings of an undirected graph  use  or more colors, then one can find  disjoint connected subgraphs of  such that each subgraph is connected by an edge to each other subgraph. Contracting the edges within each of these subgraphs so that each subgraph collapses to a single vertex produces a complete graph  on  vertices as a minor 

This conjecture, a far-reaching generalization of the four-color problem, was made by Hugo Hadwiger in 1943 and is still unsolved.  call it "one of the deepest unsolved problems in graph theory."

Equivalent forms
An equivalent form of the Hadwiger conjecture (the contrapositive of the form stated above) is that, if there is no sequence of edge contractions (each merging the two endpoints of some edge into a single supervertex) that brings a graph  to the complete  then  must have a vertex coloring with  colors.

In a minimal  of any  contracting each color class of the coloring to a single vertex will produce a complete  However, this contraction process does not produce a minor  because there is (by definition) no edge between any two vertices in the same color class, thus the contraction is not an edge contraction (which is required for minors). Hadwiger's conjecture states that there exists a different way of properly edge contracting sets of vertices to single vertices, producing a complete  in such a way that all the contracted sets are connected.

If  denotes the family of graphs having the property that all minors of graphs in  can be  then it follows from the Robertson–Seymour theorem that  can be characterized by a finite set of forbidden minors. Hadwiger's conjecture is that this set consists of a single forbidden 

Special cases and partial results
The case  is trivial: a graph requires more than one color if and only if it has an edge, and that edge is itself a  minor. The case  is also easy: the graphs requiring three colors are the non-bipartite graphs, and every non-bipartite graph has an odd cycle, which can be contracted to a 3-cycle, that is, a  minor.

In the same paper in which he introduced the conjecture, Hadwiger proved its truth  The graphs with no  minor are the series–parallel graphs and their subgraphs. Each graph of this type has a vertex with at most two incident edges; one can 3-color any such graph by removing one such vertex, coloring the remaining graph recursively, and then adding back and coloring the removed vertex. Because the removed vertex has at most two edges, one of the three colors will always be available to color it when the vertex is added back.

The truth of the conjecture for  implies the four color theorem: for, if the conjecture is true, every graph requiring five or more colors would have a  minor and would (by Wagner's theorem) be nonplanar.
Klaus Wagner proved in 1937 that the case  is actually equivalent to the four color theorem and therefore we now know it to be true. As Wagner showed, every graph that has no  minor can be decomposed via clique-sums into pieces that are either planar or an 8-vertex Möbius ladder, and each of these pieces can be 4-colored independently of each other, so the 4-colorability of a -minor-free graph follows from the 4-colorability of each of the planar pieces.

 proved the conjecture  also using the four color theorem; their paper with this proof won the 1994 Fulkerson Prize. It follows from their proof that linklessly embeddable graphs, a three-dimensional analogue of planar graphs, have chromatic number at most five. Due to this result, the conjecture is known to be true  but it remains unsolved for 

For , some partial results are known: every 7-chromatic graph must contain either a  minor or both a  minor and a  minor.

Every graph  has a vertex with at most  incident edges, from which it follows that a greedy coloring algorithm that removes this low-degree vertex, colors the remaining graph, and then adds back the removed vertex and colors it, will color the given graph with  colors.

In the 1980s, Alexander V. Kostochka and Andrew Thomason both independently proved that every graph with no  minor has average degree  and can thus be colored using  colors. 
A sequence of improvements to this bound have led to the announcement of -colorability for graphs without

Generalizations
In this context, it is worth noting that the probability also approaches one that a random  graph has Hadwiger number greater than or equal to its chromatic number, so the Hadwiger conjecture holds for random graphs with high probability; more precisely, the Hadwiger number is with high probability proportional 

 asked whether Hadwiger's conjecture could be extended to list coloring.  every graph with list chromatic number  has a  clique minor. However, the maximum list chromatic number of planar graphs is 5, not 4, so the extension fails already for  graphs.

Gerards and Seymour conjectured that every graph  with chromatic number  has a complete graph  as an odd minor. Although graphs with no odd  minor are not necessarily sparse, a similar upper bound holds for them as it does for the standard Hadwiger conjecture: a graph with no odd  minor has chromatic number 

Notes

References

Graph coloring
Graph minor theory
Conjectures
Unsolved problems in graph theory